ERC protein 2 is a protein that in humans is encoded by the ERC2 gene.

Interactions 

ERC2 (gene) has been shown to interact with PPFIA4, RIMS1, UNC13A, and liprin-alpha-1.

References

Further reading